WXLZ-FM is a Country-formatted broadcast radio station licensed to Lebanon, Virginia, serving the Lebanon/Abingdon/Castlewood area. WXLZ-FM is owned and operated by Yeary Broadcasting, Inc.

References

External links
 Country 107.3 WXLZ Online
 

XLZ-FM
Radio stations established in 1993
1993 establishments in Virginia